Alpha Plus Group is an English private education company which runs a network of pre-preparatory, preparatory and secondary independent schools, colleges and nurseries. It is the second largest private education business in the UK. The group was acquired by Sovereign Capital in 2002 and sold to DV4 Limited, advised by investment group Delancey in December 2007. The chairman of governors is Sir John Ritblat, British Land's former chairman and major Conservative Party donor. The group has been loss making since 2016 and suffered losses of £26.4 million during the 2019/20 financial year and obtained a £2.5 million bridging loan from the parent company on 17 December 2020 that was repaid on 8 January 2021.
Alpha Plus has 4,187 pupils and students in 2020 down from 4,289 in 
2016.

History

The Group's origins date from the foundation in 1931 of DLD College ‘to provide tuition for the entrance examinations to Oxford and Cambridge universities and to the British Civil Service'. The College has moved campus five times and now occupies a building near Westminster Bridge, where it educates a diverse range of home and international students. Abbey College Manchester was established as a tutorial college in 1990 and now offers GCSE, Foundation and A level courses to local and international students. Abbey College Cambridge was founded in 1994.

St Anthony's School for Boys is the oldest school owned by Alpha Plus. Founded in Eastbourne in 1893, it moved to Hampstead in 1952 and was acquired by the Group in 2009. Its sister school, St Anthony's School for Girls opened in September 2016.

Wetherby School was founded in 1951, close to the site of the new Wetherby Kensington, and moved to its current premises in 1971; although many boys go on to Wetherby Prep, the pre-prep sends large numbers every year to Westminster Under School and St Paul's Junior School. Wetherby Prep School opened in September 2004 and moved to its current premises (Bryanston Square) in September 2009. In June 2018, the Group signed an agreement to lease additional premises at 47 Bryanston Square. The Prep School expanded into the new premises in September 2019 creating 7 additional classrooms and a drama suite with stage lighting, proscenium arch and stage set. Wetherby Senior School opened in Marylebone in 2015 and continues the traditions established at Wetherby School and Wetherby Preparatory School. In 2017 Alpha Plus Group acquired the lease to Hannah House, a five-story early 20th century property with 26,000sq feet of space. Hannah House has been devoted to expanding facilities at Wetherby Senior School. In accordance with management's expectations, the senior school will be making a profit from 2021, when the founding students complete their final year.

The Falcons School for Boys, then known as Falkner House Boys, was founded in 1956 and at that time located in Notting Hill.  In September 1989 the school transferred to its pre prep site in Burnaby Gardens, Chiswick.  The preparatory site opened in Richmond in September 2008. The Falcons School for Girls, located in Putney was acquired in 2001. The Alpha Plus Group accounted for an impairment in the value of two of the Falcons schools by £2.15m in 2019 due to fee reductions and lower than expected pupil numbers.

Pembridge Hall was founded in 1979 and acquired in the 1980s. It regularly sends girls to St Paul's Girls' School, other top London schools and leading Girls' boarding schools, including recent scholarship awards to Downe House, Cheltenham Ladies and Wycombe Abbey.

Chepstow House School started life in Pembridge Villas in 2010 and subsequently moved to Lancaster Road, Notting Hill, where it will educate boys and girls up to the age of 13.

All Alpha Plus preparatory schools send boys and girls on to top English senior schools, often winning entrance scholarships.

The Minors Nursery School was founded in 1975 and moved to its current location after joining the Group in 2004. Most of its children progress to either Wetherby or Pembridge Hall, as do the majority of children at Rolfe's Nursery School, Notting Hill. Davenport Lodge Nursery, Coventry, became part of the Alpha Plus Group in May 2007.

Portland Place School was founded in the late 1990s by the former Head of Chemistry at St Paul's Girls' School, London. The main school is housed in two adjacent, Grade II listed, James Adam houses (built in c1785); two further buildings were leased in 2002 and 2004.

The Alpha Plus brand was created in 2002 by Sovereign Capital, from the acquisition of the group of schools and colleges owned by DLD. DV4 Limited, advised by Delancey, acquired the Group from Sovereign Capital in 2007 and expanded the Group through organic growth, opening new schools and acquisitions.

Alpha Plus initiated an expansion of its capacity in 2015. It opened four new schools (Wetherby Senior School, St. Anthony's School for Girls, Wetherby-Pembridge New York and Wetherby Kensington School) and posted financial losses as a consequence of the expansion.With the opening of Wetherby-Pembridge in New York and Wetherby Kensington in London the Group now has 17 schools and 3 colleges.

The failure to attract Prince George to any of the group's schools despite this having been widely expected by the press was criticised in the US media with one New York media outlet describing the situation of the Upper East Side parents who had registered their children for the Wetherby-Pembridge school as "royally screwed" and Vanity Fair describing how the New York parents were "fuming about Prince George's school choice".

Retail Bonds 
The Group has issued £80 million retail bonds that were included in a list of High Risk retail bonds by Investors Chronicle in October 2019 and have traded below par in various occasions since September 2019 reaching a low of £61 in March 2020. The retail bonds are currently mainly secured against leasehold assets following a replacement that took place in December 2019 when the freehold assets were used as collateral for a loan that the parent company obtained from the Royal Bank of Scotland. Up to date bond performance is reflected in the appropriate channel.

Controversies

Coronavirus Fee Discounts 
During the March 2020 coronavirus lockdown, the Alpha Plus Group spiked controversy when poor communication and unannounced amendments confused parents of children who went to their schools.

The group originally informed the parents in a letter signed the company's CEO, Mr. Hanley-Browne, that fees would still be fully payable and no discount would be provided, contrary to the actions taken by other schools. The Financial Times recorded one parent saying "It’s the kind of behaviour you’d expect from a distressed hedge fund". As a result of the pressure the group changed its decision and wrote to parents saying it would cut summer fees by 20 per cent at its schools. The Group described this in its 2020 financial report as follows "It was quickly recognised that, no matter how good the remote learning provision may be, learning from home imposed increased demands on parents ... the Group decided to offer a 20% discount on the summer term fees at all of its schools (40% for nursery age children)."

The Group stated in its 2020 financial report that no fee discounts were planned for the closing of schools during the spring term 2021.

Financial situation

The Group accumulated approximately £55 million of losses during the 2016-2020 period (£1.4 million in 2016,  £7.2 million in 2017, £10.4 million in 2018, £9.9m million in 2019 and $26.4 million in 2020). Those losses together with the modest decrease in pupil numbers (98 fewer in four years) have led to a controversy about the Group's financial model as well as about its financial viability and ability to repay its debts that has been reported in the financial press.

The Group's equity fell during that same period from £31.4 million in 2015 to £4.6 million in 2019. The Group stated its intention of changing its accounting methods and to adopt the revaluation model following an informal external professional valuation. The Group had a negative working capital of £60 million as at August 2019 and therefore had a significant working capital deficiency. Group revenue in the year ended 31 August 2019 was 6% higher than in the previous year. Reported EBITDA increased to £6.1m (2018:£2.7m).

Trade unions

Alpha Plus Group consulted with teaching staff in thirteen of its schools about a proposal to exit from the TPS in August 2019. The consultation closed in April 2019 and the Group withdrew from the TPS in August 2019. All teachers previously enrolled in the TPS re-enrolled in the Group's Personal Pension Plan. No contracts were terminated as a result of the Group's exit from the TPS and there were no strikes despite the unions' encouragement.

Following the increase in pension employer's pension contributions, a further 107 independent schools withdrew from the Teachers' Pension Scheme.

At the time of the consultation in 2019, representatives of the National Education Union, that represents several hundred teachers across the independent schools that make up the Group, handed out leaflets outside the Group's schools describing the situation of the teachers following the refusal by the group to either negotiate or meet the union in relation to the Group's plan of exiting the Teachers' Pension Scheme.

Glenn Kelly, the union's regional officer dealing with the issue, told the Financial Times that 'It's not my usual day-to-day work — in leafy Notting Hill where children are dropped off by nannies' and added that 'it's a brutal response from an employer that you wouldn't expect in education'".

The Group stated: "Earlier this year, it was confirmed that employer contributions into the Teachers’ Pension Scheme (“TPS”) would increase from 16.48% to 23.6% of teachers’ salaries with effect from 1 September 2019. This would increase the Group's pension costs by approximately £1.1m per annum."

Schools

Chepstow House School, Notting Hill, London
Davenport Lodge Nursery School, Coventry, West Midlands
The Falcons School for Boys, Chiswick, London
The Falcons Preparatory School for Boys Richmond, London
The Falcons School for Girls, Putney, London
Hilden Grange School, Tonbridge, Kent
Pembridge Hall School, Notting Hill, London
Portland Place School, Westminster, London
The Prebendal School, Chichester
St Anthony's School, Hampstead, London
 St. Anthony's School for Girls, Hampstead, London
Wetherby School, Notting Hill, London
 Wetherby Kensington, Kensington, London
 Wetherby Preparatory School, Marylebone, London
 Wetherby Senior School, Marylebone, London
Wetherby-Pembridge School, New York, United States
The Minors Nursery School, Pembridge Square, Notting Hill, London
Rolfe's Nursery School, London

Colleges
Abbey DLD Colleges
Abbey College, Cambridge
Abbey College, Manchester
DLD College, London

References

External links
 

Education companies of the United Kingdom
Private school organisations in England